Wilhelm August Hermann Feuerhahn (20 May 1873 in , , Province of Hanover – 19 April 1941) was a German sculptor particularly known for his architectural sculpture.

Life and achievements 

In 1905, Feuerhahn founded the Workshops for Cemetery Art together with Hugo Lederer, Georg Wrba and other sculptors. There, they designed gravestones that were marketed on the basis of type construction with simple modifications.

Feuerhahn died in Berlin at the age of 77.

Work 

 1906–1910: Building sculpture at the Theater Freiburg.
 1909: Sculpture work on the Hebbel Theater in Berlin (architect: Oskar Kaufmann).
 1911–1912: Sculptural decoration of the façades and interiors of the Stadttheater Bremerhaven (with Georg Roch; architect: Oskar Kaufmann).
 1915–1917: Donor plaques for the Bismarckturm in Burg im Spreewald (with Georg Roch)

References

Further reading 
 : Feuerhahn, Hermann. In Ulrich Thieme (ed.): Allgemeines Lexikon der Bildenden Künstler von der Antike bis zur Gegenwart. Founded by Ulrich Thieme and Felix Becker. Vol. 11: Erman–Fiorenzo. E. A. Seemann, Leipzig 1915,  (Textarchiv – Internet Archive).

External links 

Modern sculptors
German sculptors
1873 births
1941 deaths
Artists from Hanover